Petrin is a rural locality (a settlement) in Lebyazhensky Selsoviet Rural Settlement, Kursky District, Kursk Oblast, Russia. Population:

Geography 
The settlement is located in the Mlodat River basin (a left tributary of the Seym), 82 km from the Russia–Ukraine border, 13 km south-east of Kursk, 3 km from the selsoviet center – Cheryomushki.

 Streets
There are the following streets in the locality: Ryabinovaya, Sadovaya and Tsentralnaya (110 houses).

 Climate
Petrin has a warm-summer humid continental climate (Dfb in the Köppen climate classification).

Transport 
Petrin is located on the road of intermunicipal significance  (Kursk – Petrin), 10 km from the nearest railway halt 465 km (railway line Lgov I — Kursk).

The rural locality is situated 20 km from Kursk Vostochny Airport, 105 km from Belgorod International Airport and 209 km from Voronezh Peter the Great Airport.

References

Notes

Sources

Rural localities in Kursky District, Kursk Oblast